The 1956 Washington Huskies football team was an American football team that represented the University of Washington during the 1956 NCAA University Division football season.  In its only season under head coach Darrell Royal, the team compiled a 5–5 record, finished in fourth place in the Pacific Coast Conference, and was outscored 232 to 206.

Royal was hired as head coach at the University of Texas following the season, where he stayed for twenty seasons and compiled a  record, including national championships in 1963, 1969, and 1970. The Huskies' next two head coaches stayed for eighteen years each: Jim Owens (1957–74) and Don James (1975–92).

Schedule

NFL Draft selections
Four University of Washington Huskies were selected in the 1957 NFL Draft, which lasted thirty rounds with 360 selections.

References

External links
 Game program: Washington vs. Washington State at Spokane – November 24, 1956

Washington
Washington Huskies football seasons
Washington Huskies football